Adam Melonas (born 10 November 1981 in Canberra, Australia) is an Australian chef of Greek heritage.
He currently is the founder and CEO of Chew LLC - a food innovation lab in Cambridge, Massachusetts.

See also
Nouvelle cuisine

References 

Australian chefs
Australian people of Greek descent
1981 births
Living people